Kenya is a commune of the city of Lubumbashi in the Democratic Republic of the Congo. It was created in 1929 as an extension of Kamalondo.

List of Neighborhoods:
 Lualaba
 Luapula
 Luvua
 Brondo

Populated places in Haut-Katanga Province
Communes of the Democratic Republic of the Congo